Simone Schnabel (née Koch; born 25 October 1969) is a German former competitive figure skater. She is the 1983 World Junior champion and represented East Germany at the 1988 Winter Olympics in Calgary.

Career 
Koch learned her first triple jumps with coach Ingeburg Walter at the Dresdner EC. Later she was coached by Ingrid Lehmann in Berlin. She represented the GDR and her club was SC Einheit Berlin.

Koch won the World Junior Championships in 1983, at the age of 14. In 1984, she was awarded the silver medal at the World Junior Championships, placing behind another East German, Karin Hendschke.

Koch won the silver medal at the 1984 East German Championships behind Katarina Witt. She placed 4th at the 1985 European Championships.

In 1988, Koch won her second silver medal, again behind Witt, at the German Championships. She was sent to the 1988 Winter Olympics and placed 9th.

In 1989, Koch was one of the favourites for the European Championships but she lost the qualifying competition in East Germany versus Evelyn Großmann and Simone Lang.

In 1992 and 1993, following German reunification, Koch attempted to qualify for international championships but was unsuccessful.

Personal life 
Koch married Günther Schnabel and took his surname. Their daughter, Lisa-Maria, was born in 1990.

Results

References

External links 

 Webseite über Eiskunstlauf (dt./en.)

Navigation

1969 births
Living people
Sportspeople from Dresden
German female single skaters
Figure skaters at the 1988 Winter Olympics
Olympic figure skaters of East Germany
World Junior Figure Skating Championships medalists
20th-century German women
21st-century German women